Leslie Howard Gordon was a British screenwriter and actor of the silent and early sound film eras. He also directed three films in the 1930s including The Double Event (1934). He worked as a screenwriter for Stoll Pictures in the early 1920s, when the company was the largest studio in the country. He often worked with the director Sinclair Hill.

Selected filmography

Director
 The House of Unrest (1931)
 Account Rendered (1932)
 The Double Event (1934)

Screenwriter
 All the World's a Stage (1917)
 The Prey of the Dragon (1921)
 The Woman with the Fan (1921)
 The Woman of His Dream (1921)
 The Tragedy of a Comic Song (1921)
 A Romance of Wastdale (1921)
 Gwyneth of the Welsh Hills (1921) 
 The Fruitful Vine (1921) 
 The Prey of the Dragon (1921)
 The River of Stars (1921)
 Frailty (1921)
 The Knave of Diamonds (1921)
 The Eleventh Hour (1921)
 Dick Turpin's Ride to York (1922)
 Tell Your Children (1922)
 Half a Truth (1922)
 Melody of Death (1922)
 Little Brother of God (1922)
 Belonging (1922)
 The Knight Errant (1922)
 Lamp in the Desert (1922)
 The Passionate Friends 1922)
 The Guns of Loos (1928)
 Dark Red Roses (1929)
 Such Is the Law (1930)
 Other People's Sins (1931)
 The House of Unrest (1931)
 The Great Gay Road (1931)
 Account Rendered (1932)
 The First Mrs. Fraser (1932)
 It's a Boy (1933)
 The Double Event (1934)
 Melody and Romance (1937)
 The Live Wire (1937)

Actor
 Peg Woffington (1912)
 All the World's a Stage (1917)

References

Bibliography
 Low, Rachael. Filmmaking in 1930s Britain. George Allen & Unwin, 1985.

External links

British male film actors
British film directors
British male screenwriters
Year of birth missing
Year of death missing